Münsterländer may refer to:

A person from the German region of Münster
One of two breeds of dogs of the gun dog type originating in the Münster region of Germany:
Large Münsterländer, a breed of dog weighing approximately 30 kg (66 lbs)
Small Münsterländer, a breed of dog weighing approximately 16 kg (35 lbs)

Münster (region)